Blount is an unincorporated community in Kanawha County, West Virginia, United States. Blount had a post office, founded by Harry and Stella Blount which opened on October 30, 1946, and closed on October 24, 2009.

References

Unincorporated communities in Kanawha County, West Virginia
Unincorporated communities in West Virginia